Jean-Zaché Duracin (born 1947) is a bishop of the Episcopal Church serving the Bishop of Haiti.

Biography
Prior to his election as bishop, he served as Dean of Holy Trinity Cathedral in Port-au-Prince. He was elected on December 16, 1992 as Coadjutor Bishop of Haiti and was consecrated on June 2, 1993. He succeeded as diocesan in 1994.

References

External links 
Turning Point for Haiti from The Living Church

Haitian Christian clergy
Haitian Anglicans
1947 births
Living people
Place of birth missing (living people)
Episcopal bishops of Haiti